Niyar (also Romanized as Nīyar, Nayyer, Neyar, and Neyer; also known as Nīāz and Nīmār) is a village in Gavrud Rural District, Muchesh District, Kamyaran County, Kurdistan Province, Iran. At the 2006 census, its population was 1,365, in 326 families. The village is populated by Kurds.

References 

Towns and villages in Kamyaran County
Kurdish settlements in Kurdistan Province